Zee Entertainment Enterprises (formerly Zee Telefilms) is an Indian media conglomerate owned by Essel Group. Headquartered in Mumbai, it has interests in television, print, internet, film, businesses related to mobile contents, and operates 45 channels worldwide.

History

Independent era 
The company was launched on 15th of December 1991 as Zee Telefilms, a brand name that was retained until 2006.

Zee Telefilms  launched a Nickelodeon-branded programming block in 1999 as part of a distribution deal between Viacom International and Zee Telefilms. It was replaced by a new Cartoon Network block in 2002.

In 2002, the company acquired a majority stake (51%) in ETC Networks. In 2003, they planned to purchase Rajshri for ₹50 crore. With the deal, Zee would have access to all of Rajshri's films, but the plan fell later on.
In 2006, they acquired Integrated Subscriber Management Services Limited, and in November 2006, it acquired a 50% stake in Taj television, owner of TEN Sports. On that same year, the company was rebranded as Zee Entertainment Enterprises.

In February 2010, the business acquired an additional stake (95%) in TEN Sports.

In 2008, Zee Networks launched Zee Motion Pictures and Zee Limelight (now Zee Studios) for the development, production, distribution and marketing of mainstream films in Indian languages, including Hindi, Malayalam, Tamil, Telugu, Kannada, Bengali and Marathi. Some of Zee Studios's productions include Gadar: Ek Prem Katha, Natsamrat, Sairat and Rustom.

As Zee Telefilms, the company formed part of BSE Sensex from 2000 to 2005. The news and regional entertainment channel business was spun off into a separate company in 2006 as Zee News.

In May 2011, Star Den entered into a 50/50 joint venture with Zee Turner and Zee Entertainment Enterprises (ZEEL) to distribute and market all channels owned by the company and ZEEL, their respective affiliated channels and other third-party channels in India, Nepal and Bhutan.

It also owns a music label, Zee Music Company.

In 2015, Zee acquired Sarthak TV, an Odia-language pay-television channel. One year later, on 28 July 2016, it launched Zee One, aimed at the German market. A Polish version of the channel was launched in 2017.

In 2016, Zee launched Zee Mundo, a Spanish-language Bollywood movie channel targeting Latin America.

In 2017, the company acquired the majority stake of the Reliance Broadcast Network. It also planned to acquire 9X Media in October 2017 for the cost of 160 crore, however the plan fell through in March 2018.
A partially-owned subsidiary, Diligent Media Corporation, is a publisher of Indian daily newspapers and websites. DMC is a joint venture between Zee and the Dainik Bhaskar Group.

In 2018, Zee launched Zee Theatre, which offers a collection of recorded theatre plays also called teleplay- produced in India and internationally.

Sale talks 
In February 2019, media reported that Essel Group was in talks to sell their shares from the Zee Entertainment Enterprises to save from the debt.

Sony, Comcast-Atairos, a firm lead by American cable giant Comcast were shortlisted for the bid. However, they were competing with technology giant Apple and Reliance Industries among others.
 
Top Sony officials including Mike Hopkins, chairman of Sony Pictures Television, and Tony Vinciquerra, chairman of Sony Pictures, had visited Subhash Chandra and his family at his residence shortly after Chandra announced his intent to sell half of the promoter holding in Zee Entertainment Enterprises to a global strategic investor.On April 2 reports said that some other promoters were willing to sell their shares worth 332 crore.On April 3 media reported Sony and Zee Entertainment Enterprises deal off amid valuation differences which opened the door for Comcast-Atairos.
 
On August 1 media reports Invesco Oppenheimer Fund to buy 11% stake in Zee Entertainment

In September 2021, it was reported that Invesco Developing Markets Funds and OFI Global China Fund LLC, who jointly holds 17.88% stake, wanted Punit Goenka (also son of founder) to step-down as MD and CEO. It was also reported that Essel Group owns a sum of 3.99%  minority stake.

Merger with Sony Pictures Networks India 
On 22 September 2021, the company announced its intent to merge with Sony Pictures Networks India. Sony Pictures will hold a majority stake in the proposed merged entity, which will be headed by Zee's Punit Goenka. In December 2021, the merger was approved by the two companies' boards. Sony will hold a stake close to 51% in the company, with Zee controlling the remaining stake.

Controversy

Dispute between promoters 
On 11 September 2021, Invesco asked Zee management  to call an "extraordinary general meeting" (EGM) of shareholders to consider its demands. One of main demand was removal of Punit Goenka, son of the Zee Network founder. However Zee board rejects demand from Invesco to convene extraordinary general meeting. Invesco Developing Market Funds Moves to National Company Law Tribunal (NCLT) and Bombay High Court  seeking mandatory order for Zee Enterprises Entertainment Limited (ZEEL) to call the extraordinary general meeting (EGM) that the shareholder has been demanding.

OFI Global China Fund, who also moved the NCLT along with Invesco, remarked at the hearing that the meeting that Zee Entertainment board had conducted on October 1 was just a legal formality and that it's a classic case of  Forum shopping.

On 11 October 2021 Invesco write an open letter to the other share holders saying they are disappointed that the leadership of Zee has resorted to a reckless public relations campaign in response to the overwhelming demand from shareholders for leadership changes at Zee network. also they implemented that  they tried to merge Zee with some other Indian company on early 2021 but Zee board rejected it.

Zee Board replied to Invesco's open letter saying they didn't care about the company, and  Invesco is not motivated by concerns related to any corporate governance issue but "by the events that transpired during February–April 2021 pointing Invesco purposed deal with Reliance Industries.

Reliance Industries Ltd (RIL) said it proposed to merge all its media properties with Zee Entertainment at fair valuations during discussions in February and March 2021 that US investment firm Invesco helped arrange with managing director and member of the founding family of the media and entertainment company.

In 21 October, Bombay High Court asks Zee board to call EGM as demanded by shareholder Invesco, and Counsel appearing for Zee Entertainment said the company will inform the date of the EGM by the morning of October 22.

In 22 October, Zee replied to court that the board can’t give nod to something that will turn out to be illegal. so HC postponed hearing of the Zee-Invesco matter to October 26.and in October 26 Bombay High Court has restrained Invesco from taking any action in furtherance of their requisition notice (to call an EGM).

In 7 December, Invesco heading towards a resolution expected to back the merger deal with Sony as long as the Goenka family does not get any preferential equity.

In 22 December, Board of Zee signed definitive agreements with Sony after received approval from its board of directors

Zee Music vs Sonu Nigam 
Sonu Nigam alleged that he was banned by the Zee Music Company after he tweeted in support of politician Kumar Vishwas.

Operated channels

India

International

Dissolved channels

India

International

Over The Top (OTT) 

In February 2016, Zee Entertainment Enterprises forayed into video-on-demand with the launch of its OTT platform OZEE.

On 14 February 2018, this service rebranded as ZEE5. Since its relaunch as ZEE5, it streams all content from its television network and also movies and original series. ZEE5 claimed 57 million monthly active users in December 2019.

Other assets

Publishing 

 bgr
 mollywood 
 cricket country
 the health site
 India.com 
 Sugarbox
 Zee5X

Event management  

 Zee Live
 Super moon, Arth, Edu care, It's A Girl Thing
 Zee Theatre

Film distribution And music 
 Zee Studios
 Zee Plex (movie-on-demand service)
 Zee Music Company

References

External links
 

Entertainment companies of India
Film production companies based in Mumbai
Television broadcasting companies of India
Television production companies of India
Television stations in Mumbai
Indian companies established in 1991
Entertainment companies established in 1991
Essel Group
Former News Corporation subsidiaries
Television networks in India
Television stations in Delhi
Television stations in New Delhi
Mass media companies based in Mumbai
Companies based in Mumbai
Mass media companies established in 1991
Television channels and stations established in 1991
Mass media companies of India
Zee Entertainment Enterprises
1991 establishments in Maharashtra
Companies listed on the National Stock Exchange of India
Companies listed on the Bombay Stock Exchange
Announced mergers and acquisitions